Anton Theodor Eberhard August Lubowski (3 February 1952 – 12 September 1989) was a Namibian anti-apartheid activist and advocate. He was a member of the South West Africa People's Organization (SWAPO). In 1989 he was assassinated by operatives of South Africa’s Civil Cooperation Bureau. In 2015 he was declared a National Hero and his body reburied at the National Heroes' Acre outside Windhoek.

Education and early life

Born in Lüderitz, South West Africa, Lubowski attended Paul Roos Gymnasium in Stellenbosch, South Africa. He then did a year of military training with the South African Defence Force in Pretoria, before attending Stellenbosch University for law and the University of Cape Town for an LLB.

Political career

As an advocate he was a member of the Windhoek Bar. He defended political prisoners and got involved with the Namibian trade union movement in the capacity of Secretary of Finance and Administration of the National Union of Namibian Workers (NUNW). He joined SWAPO officially in 1984. Before 1989 he had no official party position but he made frequently public statements on behalf of SWAPO. He initiated the NAMLAW Project, a legal research organisation to draft legislation for Namibia after independence. He received the Austrian Bruno Kreisky Prize for Services to Human Rights. As a SWAPO activist he was detained six times by the South African authorities. In 1989 he became Deputy Secretary for Finance and Administration in the SWAPO Election Directorate. Shortly before his death he became a member of the SWAPO Central Committee.

Assassination

In the evening of 12 September 1989, Lubowski was shot by a group of assailants in front of his house in Sanderburg Street in central Windhoek. He was hit by several shots from an AK-47 automatic rifle and died from a bullet wound to his head.

On 26 August 2015, Namibia's Heroes' Day, Lubowski was reburied at Namibia's National Heroes' Acre.

In media 

Lubowski's life is described in his widow's self-published novel On Solid Ground. Lubowski's assassination is part of the backstory in Bernhard Jaumann's novel The Hour of the Jackal.

References

External links
 Anton Lubowski Educational Trust website
 Son Almo Lubowski website www.almolubowski.com

1952 births
1989 deaths
1989 in South West Africa
20th-century Namibian lawyers
20th-century Namibian politicians
Assassinated Namibian politicians
Unsolved murders in Namibia
Members of SWAPO
Namibian lawyers
National heroes of Namibia
Namibian people of German descent
People from Lüderitz
Stellenbosch University alumni
University of Cape Town alumni
White Namibian people